Dejan Boljević (born 30 May 1990) is a Montenegrin footballer who plays as a defender in Armenia for FC Alashkert.

Background 
Boljević was born in Cetinje in SR Montenegro and grew up in Budva. He started playing football at the age of seven.

Club career
He started his youth career at FK Mogren when he was eight. He moved up into the junior squad at the age of fifteen and made the first team at the age of seventeen.

In summer 2010 he moved to Serbia and signed with FK Partizan's satellite club FK Teleoptik that played in the Serbian First League. A year later, he moved to FK Smederevo playing in the Serbian SuperLiga.

In the season 2012–13 he joined 1. FC Tatran Prešov and played the first half of the 2012–13 Slovak First Football League, before returning to Serbia during winter break and plying the second half of the 2012–13 Serbian SuperLiga with FK Novi Pazar.

By then he became an experienced SuperLiga defender, and ambitious FK Čukarički brought him to their squad in summer 2013. During the two and a half years he spent with Čukarički, he won the 2014–15 Serbian Cup.

During the winter-break of 2015–16 he signed with FC Nasaf and played the first half of the 2016 Uzbek League.

In August 2016, Boljević returned to Serbia once more, this time by signing with SuperLiga side FK Voždovac.

On 30 January 2019, Boljević returned to Montenegro, signing with Budućnost Podgorica.

On 29 January 2020, Boljević signed with Kazakhstan Premier League club FC Taraz.

On 11 February 2021, Boljević signed for FC Alashkert.

Honours
Čukarički
Serbian Cup: 2014–15

Nasaf Qarshi
Uzbekistan Cup: 2016

References

External links
 

1990 births
Living people
Sportspeople from Cetinje
Association football midfielders
Montenegrin footballers
FK Mogren players
OFK Petrovac players
FK Teleoptik players
FK Smederevo players
1. FC Tatran Prešov players
FK Novi Pazar players
FK Čukarički players
FC Nasaf players
FK Voždovac players
Hibernians F.C. players
FC Luch Vladivostok players
FK Budućnost Podgorica players
FC Taraz players
Montenegrin First League players
Serbian First League players
Serbian SuperLiga players
Slovak Super Liga players
Uzbekistan Super League players
Maltese Premier League players
Russian First League players
Kazakhstan Premier League players
Montenegrin expatriate footballers
Expatriate footballers in Serbia
Montenegrin expatriate sportspeople in Serbia
Expatriate footballers in Slovakia
Montenegrin expatriate sportspeople in Slovakia
Expatriate footballers in Uzbekistan
Montenegrin expatriate sportspeople in Uzbekistan
Expatriate footballers in Malta
Montenegrin expatriate sportspeople in Malta
Expatriate footballers in Russia
Montenegrin expatriate sportspeople in Russia
Expatriate footballers in Kazakhstan
Montenegrin expatriate sportspeople in Kazakhstan